Rezvan (also Romanized as Reẕvān) is a village in Arabkhaneh Rural District, Shusef District, Nehbandan County, South Khorasan Province, Iran. At the 2006 census, its population was 15, in 6 families.

References 

Populated places in Nehbandan County